Made in Italy is a 2020 comedy-drama film written and directed by James D'Arcy (in his feature directorial debut). It stars Liam Neeson, his son, Micheál Richardson, Valeria Bilello, and Lindsay Duncan, and follows an artist who must restore a villa with his estranged son after his wife dies in a car crash.

The film was released in the United States in theatres and through video on demand platforms on 7 August 2020 by IFC Films.

Plot
Jack Foster is getting divorced from his wife Ruth. Her family is selling the art gallery where he works as a manager, which devastates him. He decides to buy the gallery by selling the old Italian home he owns with his estranged father Robert, a famous artist. The house belonged to Jack's mother and Robert's wife, an Italian woman who died in a car accident when he was small.

Jack takes Robert with him to Italy and tells him he needs the money to buy the gallery from Ruth's parents. When they arrive, they find it is completely rundown. Kate, an estate agent, comes to survey the home. She tells them the house is in a bad condition, but if they fix the house, it could be worth more. Jack tries to clean but then decides to sell the house as is.

Jack meets Natalia at her restaurant.  Robert looks at photos of his deceased wife and the whole house reminds him of her. He decides to help Jack restore the home. They hire locals to help renovate it. Robert and Jack befriend some of the locals including Natalia and invite them to a party at the house. She tells Jack that she has an eight-year-old daughter and is divorced. As her husband lied about her, she only gets partial custody.

A buyer comes to look at the house but is not satisfied. Kate tells Robert that the house needs more work, so he asks Natalia to help. After Natalia and her daughter help with the renovations. Robert tells her that after his wife died, he sent Jack away to boarding school to keep him away from all the reminders of his mother. Ever since she died, he could not drive or paint.

Kate comes over and sees the house almost fully done. A couple arrives to look at the house, and decide they want to buy it. Meanwhile, Jack tells Natalia about his impending divorce and how Ruth has taken everything from him, which she can relate to. He tells her how he could not paint like his father but thought he could make the gallery a success, but his father never supported him.

Later, he enters his father's workspace and sees painting after painting of his mother, and of himself. When Robert finds him, Jack wants to know why he locked away all his memories and his childhood. Robert says he thought it was the fastest way to get him out of pain, and Jack screams at him that he never let him in and never talked to him. He begins wrecking the space, and Robert holds him as they collapse onto the floor. Later, they talk about her for the first time, sharing memories of her, and Robert begins crying, recounting what happened the day she died. He was so wrapped up in painting that he let a young Jack walk to school. He blames himself for her death as he kept on painting. Jack hugs and comforts him, and tells him about his divorce from Ruth.

The next day, at the house, the couple who decide to buy the house disrespect it and in response Robert tells them that he will not sell the house to them, which angers Jack. Robert admits he cannot give the house up and Jack accuses him of never having any intention to sell, and returns to England.

Robert comes to see Jack, telling him he sold his London home and has enough to buy Jack out of his share of the Tuscany villa. He urges him to buy the gallery back. Jack asks him why he never came, and Robert says Ruth told him Jack did not want him to, that it was too much pressure. Robert is going to live at the Italy home and host painting holidays. Jack goes to the gallery, and when Ruth says she will not accept any offer for the gallery, he instead presents her with the signed divorce papers.

In Italy, Robert leads a painting class where Kate is a student. Jack arrives and tells Robert it was never about the money, and all he wants is his father. He then meets with Natalia, who wants to know why he did not say goodbye. He tells her that he saw her with Marzio, and she explains as he is the father of her child she has to maintain some relationship with him. They make up and decide to start over.

Cast
 Liam Neeson as Robert Foster
 Micheál Richardson as Jack Foster
 Valeria Bilello as Natalia
 Lindsay Duncan as Kate
 Marco Quaglia as Luigi
 Gian Marco Tavani as Marzio
 Helena Antonio as Raffaella
 Yolanda Kettle as Ruth
 Julian Ovenden as Gordon
 Chelsea Fitzgerald as Amy
 Flaminia Cinque as Deli Owner

Production
In October 2018, it was announced Liam Neeson and Micheál Richardson had joined the cast of the film, with James D'Arcy directing from a screenplay he wrote. Pippa Cross, Sam Tipper-Hale, and Nicola Serra will serve as producers on the film under their CrossDay Productions and Indiana Productions banners, respectively. HanWay Films and Ingenious Media will also produce the film. In May 2019, Lindsay Duncan and Valeria Bilello joined the cast of the film.

Principal photography began in April 2019.

The house in the film was Villa Fontanelle, a private villa near Montalcino, Italy. Parts of the interior were "deconstructed" (made to appear old and shabby). Some other scenes were filmed in the village of Monticchiello; the scenes in a restaurant were filmed there, at Ristorante Il Bronzino. The filming in Italy was completed on 19 June 2019.

Release
In February 2020, IFC Films acquired US distribution rights to the film. It was released on video on demand as well as in limited theaters in the United States on 7 August 2020.

Reception

Box office and VOD
In its debut weekend, Made in Italy grossed $34,400 from 111 theatres, and was also the second-most rented film on Apple TV and the iTunes Store. In its second weekend the film finished third on Apple TV's chart and fourth on Spectrum's.

Critical response 
On Metacritic, the film has a weighted average score of 44 out of 100, based on 12 critics, indicating "mixed or average reviews".

Most critics' gripes centered around the story and screenplay; Ryan Lattanzio of IndieWire wrote that the "treacly slog" of the script betrayed the "storied talent" of Neeson and the "promising gifts" of Richardson, and Peter Travers of Rolling Stone referred to it as a "mawkish tale" of grief and healing.

References

External links
 

2020 films
2020 comedy-drama films
2020s British films
2020s English-language films
2020s Italian films
British comedy-drama films
English-language Italian films
Films about divorce
Films about father–son relationships
Films about fictional painters
Films set in London
Films set in Tuscany
Films shot in Tuscany
Italian comedy-drama films